A judicial nominating commission (also judicial nominating committee, judicial nominating board) in the United States, is a body used by some U.S. states to recommend or select potential justices and judges for appointments by state governments.

Judicial nominating commissions are often established by the state constitution as part of merit selection plans. They are designed to be independent bodies. A common procedure is for the commission to receive applications for that position and forward three names to the governor, who has  some number of days (often 60) to select one.

The powers, size, role, and makeup of judicial nominating commissions vary widely from state to state. Some commissions only make recommendations for appellate courts (the state supreme court and any intermediate appellate courts). Others make recommendations for trial court judge appointments as well.

Judicial nominating commissions are also used on the county level, such as in some Alabama counties.

List of judicial nominating commissions
Current statewide judicial nominating commissions:
Alaska - Alaska Judicial Council 
Arizona - Arizona Commission on Appellate Court Appointments
Colorado - Colorado Supreme Court Nominating Commission
Connecticut - Connecticut Judicial Selection Commission
Delaware - Delaware Judicial Nominating Commission
District of Columbia - District of Columbia Judicial Nomination Commission
Florida - Florida Judicial Nominating Commission
Georgia - Georgia Judicial Nominating Commission
Hawaii - Hawaii Judicial Selection Commission
Idaho - Idaho Judicial Council
Indiana - Indiana Judicial Nominating Commission
Iowa - Iowa Judicial Nominating Commission
Kansas - Kansas Supreme Court Nominating Commission
Kentucky - Kentucky Judicial Nominating Commission
Maryland - Maryland Appellate Judicial Nominating Commission
Massachusetts - Massachusetts Judicial Nominating Commission
Minnesota - Minnesota Commission on Judicial Selection
Missouri - Missouri Appellate Judicial Commission
Montana - Montana Judicial Nominating Commission
Nebraska - Nebraska Judicial Nominating Commission
Oklahoma - Oklahoma Judicial Nominating Commission
Rhode Island - Rhode Island Judicial Nominating Commission
South Carolina - Judicial Merit Selection Commission
South Dakota - South Dakota Judicial Qualifications Commission
Tennessee - Tennessee Judicial Selection Commission
Utah - Utah Judicial Nominating Commissions
Vermont - Vermont Judicial Nominating Board
Wyoming - Wyoming Judicial Nominating Commission

Notes

External links
Judicial Merit Selection: Current Status - American Judicature Society

Selection of judges in the United States